Anthim may refer to:

 Anthim the Iberian (1650–1716), Georgian theologian, scholar, calligrapher and philosopher
 Anthim I (1816–1888), Bulgarian education figure and clergyman
 Anthim, a brand name of obiltoxaximab